"Let Somebody Go" is a song by British rock band Coldplay and American singer Selena Gomez, recorded for the band's ninth studio album, Music of the Spheres. The song was produced by Max Martin, Oscar Holter, Rik Simpson, Daniel Green, and Bill Rahko, and co-produced by Metro Boomin. The song was released for digital download and streaming through Parlophone as the third single from Music of the Spheres on 7 February 2022.

Writing and production 
Creative director Phil Harvey stated both him and Martin have been fans of Gomez, commenting she has a "unique, evocative and mysterious" tone. He initially tried to persuade the band to include the song in their eighth album Everyday Life (2019). Meanwhile, Martin noted "she's an angel" and her voice is in what he "would call 'the Rihanna bag' which are voices that are gifts to humanity". Bassist Guy Berryman explained the collaboration:

They finished the track together in April 2021. Martin credited his daughter Apple in the writing, saying she "gave me this amazing chord that I'd never thought of. So she's on there".

Music video 
A space-themed lyric video featuring animated handwritten lyrics was released on 15 October 2021. The video was directed by Pilar Zeta and Victor Scorrano and depicts Calypso, one of the celestial bodies in the fictional solar system The Spheres. A music video directed by Dave Meyers was announced on 3 February 2022, and was released on 7 February 2022. The music video was filmed in October 2021.

Live performances 
"Let Somebody Go" was first performed live on The Late Late Show with James Corden by Coldplay and Selena Gomez on the show's 18 October 2021 episode. On 2 February 2022, Chris Martin performed a solo version of the song on The Ellen DeGeneres Show.

Critical reception 
"Let Somebody Go" received positive reviews by most critics, who considered it a highlight for the album. Jon Dolan from Rolling Stone called it a "soft-focus study in post-breakup solemnity that's got more warmth and grace than most artists' crushed-out valentines". The track was also named one of the best songs of the year by Aftonbladet (#24), as they cited it as a "delicious music with only one signal: Chris Martin's habit of writing howling and presumptuous arena signs". Similarly, Cosmopolitan included it on their "55 Best Songs of 2021" list at number 21 and mentioned the collaboration was "unexpectedly awesome". The New York Post, on the other hand, ranked "Let Somebody Go" as the fifth worst song of 2021, considering it the anti-"Yellow".

Personnel 
Coldplay
 Guy Berryman – bass
 Jonny Buckland – guitar
 Will Champion – drums, backing vocals
 Chris Martin – vocals, keyboards, acoustic guitar

Additional musicians
 Selena Gomez – vocals

Technical personnel
 Max Martin – programming, production
 Oscar Holter – programming, production
 Rik Simpson – additional production
 Jon Hopkins – production
 Daniel Green – production
 Bill Rahko – production

Charts

Certifications

Release history

References 

2021 songs
Coldplay songs
Selena Gomez songs
Atlantic Records singles
Parlophone singles
Songs written by Chris Martin
Songs written by Guy Berryman
Songs written by Jonny Buckland
Songs written by Will Champion
Songs written by Max Martin
Songs written by Oscar Holter
Songs written by Metro Boomin
Song recordings produced by Max Martin
2020s ballads
Music videos directed by Dave Meyers (director)
2022 singles
Pop ballads
Rock ballads
Song recordings produced by Metro Boomin